Ravaillacz is a superquartet from Sweden, which participated at Melodifestivalen 2013 with the charting song "En riktig jävla schlager". Consisting of Tommy Körberg, Claes Malmberg, Johan Rabaeus and Mats Ronander, it ended up 10th.

The group also appeared at Allsång på Skansen on 6 August 2013.

References 

2013 establishments in Sweden
Musical groups established in 2013
Swedish musical groups
Supergroups (music)
Melodifestivalen contestants of 2013